Derrick Edward de Vere Kennedy (5 June 1904 in Dublin, Ireland – 27 June 1976 in County Dublin) was an Irish cricketer. A right-handed batsman and right-arm fast-medium bowler, he played once for the Ireland cricket team, a first-class match against Scotland in July 1924. The previous month, he played a first-class match for Dublin University against Northamptonshire.

References

1904 births
1976 deaths
Cricketers from Dublin (city)
People educated at Clifton College
Irish cricketers
Dublin University cricketers